HMS Kennet was a Thornycroft type River Class Destroyer ordered by the Royal Navy under the 1902 – 1903 Naval Estimates.  Named after the River Kennet in south west England, she was the first ship to carry this name in the Royal Navy.

Construction
She was laid down on 5 February 1902, at the Thornycroft shipyard at Chiswick and launched on 4 December 1903. She was completed on 1 January 1905. Her original armament was to be the same as the Turleback torpedo boat destroyers that preceded her. In 1906, the Admiralty decided to upgrade the armament by landing the five 6-pounder naval guns and shipping three 12-pounder 8 hundredweight (cwt) guns. Two would be mounted abeam at the foc'x'le break and the third gun would be mounted on the quarterdeck.

Pre-War
After commissioning she was assigned to the East Coast Destroyer Flotilla of the 1st Fleet and based at Harwich.

On 7 August 1906, Kennet was struck by the destroyer  in Plymouth harbour when Leopard was unsuccessfully attempting to avoid hitting a buoy. Kennets rudder was damaged by the impact, while Leopards hull was holed below the waterline when she struck the buoy. On 27 April 1908, the Eastern Flotilla departed Harwich for live fire and night manoeuvres. During these exercises the cruiser  rammed and sank the destroyer  then damaged .

In 1909/1910 she was assigned to China Station.

On 30 August 1912, the Admiralty directed all destroyers were to be grouped into classes designated by letters, with the River-class becoming known officially as the E-Class. The class letters were painted on the hull below the bridge area and on one of the funnels.

World War I
She deployed with China Squadron to Tsingtao to blockade the German base. On 22 August, Kennet, under the command of Lieutenant Commander F.A. Russel, RN, was damaged in action with the German torpedo boat , the German gunboat  and a 4-inch shore battery off Tsingtao. On 24 November 1914, after the Japanese declaration of war she returned to Hong Kong.

Upon the arrival of the transports on 16 April, she, Wear and Jed pursued the Turkish torpedo boat Demir Hissar attacking the transport SS Manitou at Tribouki. The Turkish torpedo boat was driven ashore and destroyed. They shared the prize monies awarded.

On 24 April, she carried out a reconnaissance round the north end of Xeros Bay by Karachali and as far as Liman Bay.

On 25 April 1915, she, along with Jed, supported the landings at ANZAC Cove as part of the 3rd Division’s feint attack on Bulair.

5 July 1915, found her on the Smyrna Patrol enforcing the blockade of the Turkish Coast from Cape Kaba to Latitude 38o30’E, 200 nautical miles including Smyrna. At this time she was based at Port Iero on the Island of Mytilene.

On 20 November 1915, she shelled Turkish positions on the left of the British lines at Suvla.

She remained in the Mediterranean until the end of the war.

Disposition
In 1919, she returned to Home waters, was paid off and laid up in reserve awaiting disposal. On 11 December 1919, she was sold to J.H. Lee for breaking at Dover.

She was awarded the Battle Honour Dardanelles 1915 - 1916 for her service.

Pennant Numbers
It is not known if she was assigned a pennant number as no record has been found.

References

Bibliography
 
 
 
 
 
 
 

 

River-class destroyers
World War I destroyers of the United Kingdom
1903 ships
Ships built by John I. Thornycroft & Company